Ignacio Canuto (born 20 February 1986 in Santa Fe) is an Argentine footballer, who plays as a centre-back.

He has previously played for Unión (Argentina), Ben Hur (Argentina), Argentinos Juniors (Argentina), Maccabi Haifa (Israel), Libertad (Paraguay), LDU Quito (Ecuador), Tigre (Argentina) and León (Mexico).

Career

Club
Canuto began his playing career in 2004 with Unión. After a loan spell with Ben Hur in 2007, he joined Argentinos Juniors of the Argentine Primera División in 2008. He was a regular player for the Argentinos Juniors team that won the Clausura 2010 championship. He played in 13 of the club's 19 games during their championship winning campaign. In July 2010, Canuto was sold to Maccabi Haifa of the Israeli Premier League. The club signed him to a five-year contract. After a spell in Israel, Canuto joined Paraguayan Primera División club Libertad. He played 32 times and scored 6 goals for the club before moving clubs once again as he joined Brazilian top-flight side Figueirense, 3 goals in 28 appearances in all competitions followed. Although he played for Figueirense, Brazilian Série C team Tombense own his federation rights.

2013 saw Canuto leave Brazil for Ecuador as he joined LDU Quito, he only stayed for one season but did play 43 league fixtures for the club while scoring three goals. He returned to Argentina in 2014 to sign for Tigre. His first two games for Tigre ended 0–0, and when he did win his first game with the team it was he who scored the winning goal; versus Racing Club de Avellaneda. He made 36 appearances over two campaigns for Tigre before leaving. His next club became Mexican Liga MX side León in January 2015. Four months and 11 games later, Canuto left León before eventually signing for Argentine Primera División club Atlético Tucumán in 2016.

International
On 20 May 2009 Canuto made his international debut in a friendly match against Panama. He came on as a second-half substitute for the Argentina team, made up of players based in the Primera División Argentina. Canuto scored his first international goal on his third appearance for Argentina on 10 February 2010 to secure a 2-1 win over Jamaica. He scored in the 93rd minute of the game, only 2 minutes after having come into the game as a late 2nd half substitute.

International goals
. Scores and results list Argentina's goal tally first.

|-
|1||10 February 2010||Estadio José María Minella, Mar del Plata, Argentina|||| align=center | 2–1|| align=center | 2–1||Friendly||
|}

Career statistics

Club
.

Honours
Argentinos Juniors 
Argentine Primera División (1): Clausura 2010

References

External links

 Argentine Primera statistics

1986 births
Living people
Footballers from Santa Fe, Argentina
Argentine footballers
Argentine expatriate footballers
Argentina international footballers
Association football defenders
Unión de Santa Fe footballers
Argentinos Juniors footballers
Maccabi Haifa F.C. players
Club Libertad footballers
Figueirense FC players
L.D.U. Quito footballers
Club Atlético Tigre footballers
Club León footballers
Atlético Tucumán footballers
Club Atlético Lanús footballers
Club Atlético Platense footballers
Israeli Premier League players
Paraguayan Primera División players
Liga MX players
Campeonato Brasileiro Série A players
Argentine Primera División players
Argentine expatriate sportspeople in Israel
Argentine expatriate sportspeople in Paraguay
Argentine expatriate sportspeople in Brazil
Argentine expatriate sportspeople in Ecuador
Expatriate footballers in Israel
Expatriate footballers in Paraguay
Expatriate footballers in Brazil
Expatriate footballers in Ecuador